The Tanks Are Coming may refer to:

 The Tanks Are Coming (1941 film), a 1941 short film
 The Tanks Are Coming (1951 film), a 1951 film